Wahoo is an impact crater  on Mars. The crater was named after the town of Wahoo, Nebraska, United States, by IAU in 2010.

References 

Impact craters on Mars